Solar System models, especially mechanical models, called orreries, that illustrate the relative positions and motions of the planets and moons in the Solar System have been built for centuries. While they often showed relative sizes, these models were usually not built to scale. The enormous ratio of interplanetary distances to planetary diameters makes constructing a scale model of the Solar System a challenging task. As one example of the difficulty, the distance between the Earth and the Sun is almost 12,000 times the diameter of the Earth.

If the smaller planets are to be easily visible to the naked eye, large outdoor spaces are generally necessary, as is some means for highlighting objects that might otherwise not be noticed from a distance.  The Boston Museum of Science has placed bronze models of the planets in major public buildings, all on similar stands with interpretive labels. For example, the model of Jupiter is located in the cavernous South Station waiting area. The properly-scaled, basket-ball-sized model is 1.3 miles (2.14 km) from the model Sun which is located at the museum, graphically illustrating the immense empty space in the Solar System. 

The objects in such large models do not move. Traditional orreries often did move, and some used clockworks to display the relative speeds of objects accurately. These can be thought of as being correctly scaled in time, instead of distance.

Permanent true scale models
Many towns and institutions have built outdoor scale models of the Solar System. Here is a table comparing these models with the actual system.

Other models of the Solar System: historic, temporary, virtual, or dual-scale

Several sets of geocaching caches have been laid out as Solar System models.

See also
Numerical model of the Solar System
Historical models of the Solar System
Infinite Corridor

References

External links

A list of websites related to Solar System models
The Otford Solar System
An accurate web-based scroll map of the Solar System scaled to the Moon being 1 pixel
An online scale model (does not work in some browsers)
An online 3D model
An article on the Solar System in Maine
An article about a temporary exhibit in Melbourne, Australia
A map with Solar System models in Germany
A tool to calculate the diameters and distances needed for an accurate scale model
To Scale: The Solar System - video of model built in desert with Earth as the size of a marble.

Physics education
Scale modeling